The  is one of nine active divisions of the Japan Ground Self-Defense Force. The division is subordinated to the Western Army and is headquartered in Kumamoto. Its responsibility is the defense of the Kagoshima, Kumamoto and Miyazaki prefectures.

The division was raised on 18 January 1962.

Organization 

 8th Division, in Kumamoto
 8th Division HQ, in Kumamoto
 12th Infantry Regiment, in Kirishima, with 1x headquarters, four Type 73 armored personnel carrier, and 1x 120mm mortar company
 42nd Rapid Deployment Regiment, in Kumamoto, with 1x headquarters, three Type 96 armored personnel carrier, 1x Type 16 maneuver combat vehicle, and 1x 120mm F1 mortar company
 43rd Infantry Regiment, in Miyakonojō, with 1x headquarters, four Type 73 armored personnel carrier, and 1x 120mm mortar company
 8th Anti-Aircraft Artillery Battalion, in Kumamoto, with Type 81 and Type 93 Surface-to-air missile systems
 8th Engineer Battalion (Combat), in Satsumasendai
 8th Signal Battalion, in Kumamoto
 8th Reconnaissance Company, in Kumamoto, with Type 87 armored reconnaissance vehicles
 Western Army Ground-to-Ship and Anti-Tank Unit, in Kusu, with 3x Type 96 Multi-Purpose Missile System platoons (administrative control during peacetime)
 8th Aviation Squadron, in Mashiki, flying UH-1J and OH-6D helicopters
 8th NBC Protection Company, in Kumamoto
 Amami Area Security Force, Amami
 8th Logistic Support Regiment, in Kumamoto
 1st Maintenance Battalion
 2nd Maintenance Battalion
 Supply Company
 Medical Company
 Transport Company

References

External links
 Homepage 8th Division (Japanese)

Japan Ground Self-Defense Force Division
Military units and formations established in 1962